Myanmar participated in the 1998 Asian Games held in Bangkok, Thailand from December 6, 1998 to December 20, 1998. Athletes from Myanmar succeeded in winning one gold, six silvers and four bronzes, making a total of eleven medals. Myanmar finished at twentieth position in a medal table.

References

Nations at the 1998 Asian Games
1998
Asian Games